Antigua and Barbuda participated in the 2010 Summer Youth Olympics in Singapore.

The Antigua and Barbuda team consisted of 4 athletes competing in 2 sports: Athletics and Swimming.

Athletics

Boys
Track and Road Events

Girls
Track and Road Events

Swimming

References

External links
Competitors List: Antigua and Barbuda

Nations at the 2010 Summer Youth Olympics
2010 in Antigua and Barbuda sport
Antigua and Barbuda at the Youth Olympics